Sébastian Hell (born September 14, 1978) is a Canadian musician, songwriter and screenwriter who is also the manager of the UnPop Montreal. He fronts a band called Sébastian Hell/Blooze Konekshun and also performs solo. In June 2020, he released an album titled A Reflection On Police Brutality (Vol. 1).

References

External links
 Sébastian Hell on MySpace
 Sébastian Hell on CD Baby
 

1978 births
Canadian male singer-songwriters
Canadian singer-songwriters
Singers from Montreal
Canadian rock singers
Canadian rock musicians
Living people
Francophone Quebec people
Concordia University alumni
People from Côte-des-Neiges–Notre-Dame-de-Grâce
Université de Montréal alumni
21st-century Canadian male singers